Razan County is in Hamadan province, Iran. The capital of the county is the city of Razan. At the 2006 census, the county's population was 111,120 in 26,277 households. The following census in 2011 counted 116,437 people in 31,598 households. At the 2016 census, the county's population was 107,587 in 32,207 households. Qorveh-e Darjazin District was separated from the county to form Qorveh-e Darjazin County in 2019.)

Administrative divisions

The population history of Razan County's administrative divisions over three consecutive censuses is shown in the following table. The latest census shows three districts, seven rural districts, and three cities.

Notable people
Among the many people of note from Razan County are: Molla-Ali Masoumi, Dr. Mohammad Mofatteh, Mohyedin Anvari, Mohammad Piran, Mostafa Rahmandost, Sedighe Vasmaghi, Ghorbanali Namdari, Hossein Nori-Hamdani, Dr. Nosrati, and MirzaHasan Razini.

References

 

Counties of Hamadan Province